Veronica Dunne may refer to:
Veronica Dunne (actor), actor in K.C. Undercover
Veronica Dunne (soprano) (1927–2021), Irish opera singer and singing teacher